John Glen may refer to:

John Glen (1744–1799), mayor of Savannah
John Glen (director) (born 1932), English film director and editor
John Glen (mayor) (1809–1895), mayor of Atlanta
John Glen (politician) (born 1974), UK Conservative politician

See also
John Glenn (disambiguation)